Scandal Maker is a 2016 Chinese comedy-drama film directed by Ahn Byeong-ki, starring Tong Dawei and Michelle Chen and a remake of the 2008 South Korean film Scandal Makers. It was released in China on November 11, 2016.

Plot

Cast
Tong Dawei
Michelle Chen
Lü Yuncong
Liu Ruilin
Wen Xin
Pan Bin-long
Li Xiaochuan
Zhao Longhao
Peng Ziheng
Zhang Youhao
Li Weijian 
Li Yu
Li Jing
Teng Fei
Xu Jingying

Reception
The film grossed  on its opening weekend in China.

References

External links

Films directed by Ahn Byeong-ki
Wuzhou Film Distribution films
Huaxia Film Distribution films
Chinese comedy-drama films
2016 comedy-drama films
Chinese remakes of South Korean films